Catfish Blues may refer to:
 "Catfish Blues" (song), a blues song first recorded by American musician Robert Petway
 Catfish Blues (film), a 2016 American film